Nicolas Haquin (born 15 December 1980, in Léhon) is a French footballer who plays as an attacker.

Haquin was born in Léhon, France, in 1980. He started his professional career in 2005, playing for EA Guingamp's reserves. In 2006, he moved up to the full team. Since then he has played 35 matches and scored ten goals, nine in Ligue 2 and one in a cup match.

References
 

French footballers
Living people
En Avant Guingamp players
Clermont Foot players
Vannes OC players
1980 births
Ligue 2 players
Association football forwards
Sportspeople from Côtes-d'Armor
Footballers from Brittany
Brittany international footballers